This is a list of football clubs that compete within the leagues and divisions of the Lebanese football league system as far down as the Lebanese Third Division.

By league and division
 Lebanese Premier League (Level 1)
 Lebanese Second Division (Level 2)
 Lebanese Third Division (Level 3)

Alphabetically
The divisions are correct for the 2022–23 season.

Key



A

B

C

E

H

I

K

M

N

O

R

S

T

W

See also
 List of women's football clubs in Lebanon
 List of top-division football clubs in AFC countries

Lebanon
 
Men's